Karl Amoussou (born November 21, 1985) is a French-German  professional mixed martial artist who most recently competed in the Welterweight division of Cage Warriors, where he is the current Welterweight Champion. A professional competitor since 2006, he has also formerly competed for Strikeforce, DREAM, M-1 Global, Pancrase and Bellator MMA.

Background
Amoussou was born in Draguignan, France. His martial arts background is in judo, his older brother Bertrand being a medal-winning judoka for France in the 1990 European Judo Championships as well as the first and only French fighter to win a fight in Pride FC, while Amoussou's Senegalese father was also a successful karate stylist. Before becoming a full-time fighter, Amoussou worked full-time as an undercover agent in his native France, mostly tracking down drug dealers and thieves.

Mixed martial arts career
Amoussou (nicknamed Psycho) is a member of the Team France and Team "Haute Tension". His trainers are one time PRIDE Fighting Championship fighter and older brother Bertrand Amoussou.

Amoussou was set to headline M-1 Global Presents: Breakthrough against top contender Nick Thompson but his opponent was later changed to journeyman John Doyle due to an injury Thompson suffered during training.

Amoussou signed an exclusive four fight contract with top Japanese promotion Dream and North American promotion Strikeforce. He fought in Strikeforce against UFC veteran Trevor Prangley and in Dream against Pride veteran Kazuhiro Nakamura. In April 2011, he defeated Nathan Shouteren via decision after a spectacular fight where he showed his "Psycho" style again.

In November 2010, he went to The Ultimate Fighter selections in Las Vegas, but his weight class was not selected.

Bellator Fighting Championships
Amoussou then signed for Bellator and he made his debut on May 21, 2011 against Sam Alvey at Bellator 45, losing via split decision. He rebounded with a TKO victory over Jesus Martinez at Bellator 59 in November 2011.

Amoussou then took part in the Welterweight Tournament scheduled to take place in Bellator's sixth season. He was expected to fight War Machine in the opening round of the tournament at Bellator 63. However, War Machine was sentenced to a year in prison for an assault in Las Vegas, Nevada and was forced out of the bout and the tournament.  Instead, he faced Chris Lozano and won via submission in the first round.

In the semifinals at Bellator 69, Amoussou faced undefeated David Rickels. The bout was back-and-forth with Amoussou on the receiving end of multiple groin shots. In the end, Amoussou won the fight via split decision.

Amoussou faced Bryan Baker on July 20, 2012 in the finals at Bellator 72. He won the fight via submission in just under a minute, earning $100,000 and a title shot. He faced welterweight champion Ben Askren in Bellator's seventh season in the fall of 2012. He then lost by TKO to Askren for the title.

Amoussou next faced promotional newcomer Paul Bradley on October 18, 2013 at Bellator 104. He lost the fight via unanimous decision. Amossou then faced David Gomez on April 18, 2014, at Bellator 117. He won fight via split decision, snapping his two fight losing streak.

Amoussou faced Fernando Gonzalez at Bellator 122 on July 25, 2014. He lost the fight via unanimous decision.

Post Bellator 
Going 10–2 since leaving Bellator, Amoussou face Abdoul Abdouraguimov on June 25, 2022 at Ares FC 7 for the AFC Welterweight Championship. He lost the bout after the doctor stopped the bout after the first round.

Amoussou faced Mickaël Lebout on December 8, 2022 at Ares FC 10, losing the bout via unanimous decision.

Championships and accomplishments
Bellator Fighting Championships
Bellator Season 6 Welterweight Tournament Championship
2012 Bellator Submission of the Year (against Bryan Baker)

Mixed martial arts record

|-
|Loss
|align=center|27–11–2
|Mickaël Lebout
|Decision (unanimous)
|Ares FC 10
|
|align=center|3
|align=center|5:00
|Paris, France
|
|-
|Loss
|align=center|
|Abdoul Abdouraguimov
|TKO (doctor stoppage)
|Ares FC 7
|
|align=center|1
|align=center|5:00
|Paris, France
|
|-
|Win
|align=center|27–9–2
|André Ricardo
|Submission (achilles lock)
|Hexagone MMA 2
|
|align=center|1
|align=center|4:31
|Paris, France
|
|-
|Win
| align=center|26–9–2
|Vitoldas Jagelo
|Disqualification
|Hexagone MMA 1
|
|align=center|1
|align=center|5:00
|Paris, France
|
|-
|Win
|align=center|25–9–2
|Zoran Đođ
|TKO (knees)
|Soko FC 1
|
|align=center|1
|align=center|2:50
|Dudelange, Luxembourg
|
|-
|Loss
|align=center|24–9–2
|Rodrigo Cavalheiro
|KO (punch)
|Brave CF 13: European Evolution
|
|align=center|2
|align=center|1:08
|Belfast, Northern Ireland
|
|-
|Loss
| align=center|24–8–2
|Dominique Steele 
|Decision (unanimous)
|Cage Warriors  89
|
|align=center|3
|align=center|5:00
|Antwerp, Belgium
|
|-
| Win
| align=center|24–7–2
| Matt Inman
| TKO (punches)
| Cage Warriors 80
| 
| align=center| 1
| align=center| 3:13
| London, England
|  
|-
|Win
| align=center| 23–7–2
| Juho Valamaa
| KO (punch)
| EuroFC 1
| 
| align=center| 1
| align=center| 3:44
| Espoo, Finland
|
|-
|Win
| align=center| 22–7–2
| Giovanni Melillo
| TKO (head kick and punches)
| Venator FC 3
| 
| align=center| 1 
| align=center| 4:51
| Milan, Italy
|
|-
| Win
| align=center| 21–7–2
| Hakon Foss
| Submission (heel hook)
|Venator FC 2
|
|align=center|1
|align=center|0:52
|Rimini, Italy
|
|-
| Win
| align=center| 20–7–2
| Abdulmazhid Magomedov
| Submission (armbar)
| Abu Dhabi Warriors 3
| 
| align=center| 1
| align=center| 3:43
| Abu Dhabi, United Arab Emirates
|
|-
| Win
| align=center| 19–7–2
| Florent Betorangal
| Submission (heel hook)
| World Warriors FC: Cage Encounter 4
| 
| align=center| 1
| align=center| 3:03
| Paris, France
|
|-
| Win
| align=center| 18–7–2
| Felipe Salvador Nsue Ayiugono
| Submission (armbar)
| Fightor 1: Lister vs. Knaap
| 
| align=center|3
| align=center|3:26
| Charleroi, Belgium
|
|-
| Loss
| align=center| 17–7–2
| Fernando Gonzalez
| Decision (unanimous)
| Bellator 122
| 
| align=center| 3
| align=center| 5:00
| Temecula, California, United States
| 
|-
| Win
| align=center| 17–6–2
| David Gomez
| Decision (split)
| Bellator 117
| 
| align=center| 3
| align=center| 5:00
| Council Bluffs, Iowa, United States
| 
|-
| Loss
| align=center| 16–6–2
| Paul Bradley
| Decision (unanimous)
| Bellator 104
| 
| align=center| 3
| align=center| 5:00
| Cedar Rapids, Iowa, United States
| 
|-
| Loss
| align=center| 16–5–2
| Ben Askren
| TKO (doctor stoppage)
| Bellator 86
| 
| align=center| 3
| align=center| 5:00
| Thackerville, Oklahoma, United States
|  
|-
| Win
| align=center| 16–4–2
| Bryan Baker
| Submission (inverted heel hook)
| Bellator 72
| 
| align=center| 1
| align=center| 0:56
| Tampa, Florida, United States
| 
|-
| Win
| align=center| 15–4–2
| David Rickels
| Decision (split)
| Bellator 69
| 
| align=center| 3
| align=center| 5:00
| Lake Charles, Louisiana, United States
| 
|-
| Win
| align=center| 14–4–2
| Chris Lozano
| Submission (rear-naked choke)
| Bellator 63
| 
| align=center| 1
| align=center| 2:05
| Uncasville, Connecticut, United States
| 
|-
| Win
| align=center| 13–4–2
| Jesus Martinez
| TKO (punches)
| Bellator 59
| 
| align=center| 1
| align=center| 2:20
| Atlantic City, New Jersey, United States
| 
|-
| Loss
| align=center| 12–4–2
| Sam Alvey
| Decision (split)
| Bellator 45
| 
| align=center| 3
| align=center| 5:00
| Lake Charles, Louisiana, United States
| 
|-
| Win
| align=center| 12–3–2
| Nathan Schouteren
| Decision (split)
| Pancrase Fighting Championship 3
| 
| align=center| 2
| align=center| 5:00
| Marseille, France
| 
|-
| Loss
| align=center| 11–3–2
| Kazuhiro Nakamura
| Decision (unanimous)
| Dream 15
| 
| align=center| 2
| align=center| 5:00
| Saitama, Saitama, Japan
| 
|-
| Draw
| align=center| 11–2–2
| Trevor Prangley
| Technical Draw (thumb to eye)
| Strikeforce Challengers: Kaufman vs. Hashi
| 
| align=center| 1
| align=center| 4:14
| San Jose, California, United States
| 
|-
| Win
| align=center| 11–2–1
| John Doyle
| Submission (rear-naked choke)
| M-1 Global: Breakthrough
| 
| align=center| 1
| align=center| 3:15
| Kansas City, Missouri, United States
| 
|-
| Win
| align=center| 10–2–1
| Kazuhiro Hamanaka
| KO (flying knee)
| M-1 Challenge 14: Japan
| 
| align=center| 1
| align=center| 0:23
| Tokyo, Japan
| 
|-
| Win
| align=center| 9–2–1
| Grégory Babene
| Submission (armbar)
| 100 Percent Fight 1
| 
| align=center| 2
| align=center| 3:05
| Paris, France
| 
|-
| Loss
| align=center| 8–2–1
| Lucio Linhares
| TKO (punches)
| M-1 Challenge 10: Finland
| 
| align=center| 1
| align=center| 4:52
| Helsinki, Finland
| 
|-
| Win
| align=center| 8–1–1
| Min Suk-Heo
| Decision (split)
| M-1 Challenge 8: USA
| 
| align=center| 3
| align=center| 5:00
| Kansas City, Missouri, United States
| 
|-
| Win
| align=center| 7–1–1
| Mike Dolce
| TKO (kick to the body)
| M-1 Challenge 5: Japan
| 
| align=center| 2
| align=center| 0:41
| Tokyo, Japan
| 
|-
| Win
| align=center| 6–1–1
| Dmitry Samoilov
| KO (head kick)
| M-1: Slamm
| 
| align=center| 1
| align=center| 0:18
| Flevoland, Netherlands
| 
|-
| Loss
| align=center| 5–1–1
| Arman Gambaryan
| Decision (unanimous)
| M-1 MFC: Battle on the Neva
| 
| align=center| 3
| align=center| 5:00
| Saint Petersburg, Russia
| 
|-
| Win
| align=center| 5–0–1
| Mark O'Toole
| Submission (rear-naked choke)
| Cage Warriors: Enter The Rough House 2
| 
| align=center| 1
| align=center| 2:38
| Nottingham, England
| 
|-
| Win
| align=center| 4–0–1
| Alexander Yakovlev
| Submission (armbar)
| M-1 MFC: International Mix Fight
| 
| align=center| 1
| align=center| 1:44
| Saint Petersburg, Russia
| 
|-
| Win
| align=center| 3–0–1
| Brian Maulany
| Submission
| Kickboxing Gala Free-Fight
| 
| align=center| 1
| align=center| N/A
| Beverwijk, Holland
| 
|-
| Win
| align=center| 2–0–1
| Lee Chadwick
| Submission (rear-naked choke)
| CWFC: Showdown
| 
| align=center| 1
| align=center| 0:31
| Sheffield, England
| 
|-
| Win
| align=center| 1–0–1
| Colin McKee
| Submission (triangle choke)
| 2H2H: Road to Japan
| 
| align=center| 1
| align=center| 0:35
| Amsterdam, Netherlands
| 
|-
| Draw
| align=center| 0–0–1
| Marcello Salazar
| Draw
| Championnat D'Europe
| 
| align=center| 2
| align=center| N/A
| Geneva, Switzerland
|

References

External links

Karl Amoussou Official Website

Living people
1985 births
French mixed martial artists of Black African descent
Middleweight mixed martial artists
Mixed martial artists utilizing judo
Mixed martial artists utilizing savate
Mixed martial artists utilizing Muay Thai
French male judoka
French Muay Thai practitioners
French savateurs
French sportspeople of Senegalese descent
Sportspeople from Var (department)